Kargał-Las  is a village in Gmina Wola Krzysztoporska, Piotrków County, Łódź Voivodeship, Poland.

References

Villages in Piotrków County